Coton Hill is an historic suburb of the town of Shrewsbury, Shropshire, situated in the ancient parish of St Mary (with a small enclave of the parish of St Julian in Greenfields), in the West Midlands of England. The River Severn flows nearby to the west, whilst Bagley Brook, the original river bed of the Severn runs to the east.

History and development
Historians have suggested that the area became known as Coton Hill through the second occupations of its inhabitants. The area is believed to have been populated before the 1066 conquest, and its occupants were described as being cotters (someone who farmed or reared cattle).

Coton Hill had an unusual number of public houses in proximity to each other, thanks to being on the historic route from Ellesmere and Chester. Pubs include the Woody (Woodman Inn), the Bird in Hand, the Royal Oak and the Severn Apprentice. The Severn Apprentice was closed in May 2009 and was later gutted by fire with the site it occupied being redeveloped for housing.

A strangely named passage exists in this old former village – "Pig Trough". The Shropshire Agricultural Showground is just outside Coton Hill, and this is used once a year, usually in May, to hold the Shropshire County Show.

There has been, and continues to be, some residential development in this popular suburb of the county town. It is close to the town centre and yet also remains close to the countryside of Shropshire. Council houses were built in the suburb as a means of being grateful to First World War veterans. These were to number 195, but in the end only 70 were built, with the project reaching completion in 1924.

Transport
During the 19th century the area became a centre for railway freight and two huge yards grew up in the area (Coton Hill North and Coton Hill South), on the Shrewsbury to Chester Line. Although the line is still running passenger and some freight services, only one of these yards still exists and it was disused for a long time. In 2015, freight trains started running from the yard again, carrying stone from Bayston Hill (which is transported from the quarry south of Shrewsbury to Coton Hill by lorry) to destinations including Theale and Tinsley in Sheffield. A serious rail crash occurred at Coton Hill South in January 1965.

Notable people
Coton Hill was the birthplace in 1653 of 17th century admiral John Benbow,
William Wingfield, cricketer, died at Coton Hill in 1913.

See also

Bagley Brook
Bagley

References

Suburbs of Shrewsbury
Populated places on the River Severn